Mount Barker Junction railway station is a disused station on the Adelaide to Wolseley line serving the South Australian city of Mount Barker.

History
Mount Barker Junction station opened in 1883, and consisted of a main platform with a timber station building identical to the one at Balhannah, with a tall signal box next to the building. An island platform was built as well. The timber building and signal box were replaced with the current brick building in 1943. The island platform was demolished around the time the station closed to passengers by 1984 when the passenger service to Victor Harbor ceased.

It became a junction station when the Victor Harbor line opened. When the Adelaide-Wolseley line was gauge converted to standard gauge in 1995, the Victor Harbor line was isolated from the rest of the Australian National network. SteamRanger subsequently relocated from Dry Creek to Mount Barker, and runs broad gauge services south on the line from Mount Barker station. Until 2005, SteamRanger ran a Junction Jogger service from Mount Barker station to this location, but ceased probably due to a worn-out track along this section.

References

External links
Johnny's Pages gallery

Disused railway stations in South Australia
Railway stations in Australia opened in 1883